Smidstrup is a town in the Gribskov Municipality in North Zealand, Denmark. It is a coastal town and is located next to the Kattegat, four kilometers west of Gilleleje, three kilometers east of Vejby Strand and 12 kilometers north of Helsinge. As of 2022, it has a population of 1,195.

References 

Cities and towns in the Capital Region of Denmark
Gribskov Municipality